Carro Morrell Clark (pen name, Carro Frances Warren; September 6, 1867 – February 16, 1950) was the founder and manager of the C. M. Clark Publishing Company, located in Boston, who, from 1900 through the end of 1906, was reported by some to be the only woman to publish books in the United States and some claimed in the world.

The C. M. Clark Publishing Company operated from September 1900 to April 1912 and had its headquarters at 211 Tremont Street, Boston. Clark was born and raised on a farm in Unity, Maine.

The company's first release, Quincy Adams Sawyer and Mason's Corner Folks- A Story of New England Home Life by Charles Felton Pidgin, was aggressively marketed by Clark,  and sold 500,000 copies.  It was made into a play, a musical, and in 1922, a movie of the same title starring Lon Chaney and Blanche Sweet.  Another book, Miss Petticoats, also went into theatrical production and was performed by, among others, Kathryn Osterman and the future film director, D.W. Griffith.  In 1916, it was adapted as a silent film starring future Academy Award-winner Alice Brady.

She also authored ten "Garden Series" children's books under the pen name "Carro Frances Warren".

In 1897, Carro married Charles F. Atkinson of Boston; they divorced in 1913.  In 1914, she married the theater architect, Leon H. Lempert, Jr., of Rochester, New York.

References

Women in publishing
American publishers (people)
People from Unity, Maine
1867 births
1950 deaths
20th-century American businesspeople
20th-century pseudonymous writers
Pseudonymous women writers